Synapse Films is an American DVD and Blu-ray label, founded in 1997 and specializing in cult horror, science fiction and exploitation films.

History
Synapse Films was owned and operated by Don May, Jr. and his business partners Jerry Chandler and Charles Fiedler, the catalyst being May's longstanding interest in and passion for TV and cinema. May explained, “I caught the laserdisc bug while working at a local laserdisc store while I was in college. I was selling laserdisc players and buying product and I pretty much spent every extra dollar I had on laserdiscs. I loved movies and the disc format and knew this was a business I wanted to be in.” May became a part owner of Elite Entertainment after leaving his aforementioned job in laserdisc retail.

The Synapse catalog ranges from European horror touchstones like Vampyros Lesbos, and Castle of Blood, to important genre documentaries including Roy Frumkes' Document of the Dead, from drive-in favorites like The Brain That Wouldn't Die to Leni Riefenstahl's Nazi film Triumph of the Will.

In 2004, Synapse released the controversial Thriller – A Cruel Picture on DVD, followed by a Blu-ray release in 2022. A competing 4k UHD release by Vinegar Syndrome is set for later in 2022, raising questions as to which company has a current and valid license to the title.

Detroit film scholar Nicholas Schlegel released his documentary The Synapse Story in its entirety on YouTube. The documentary details the history and vision of the label and its founders.

More films from Synapse Films:

 42nd Street Forever Vol. 1 
 42nd Street Forever Vol. 2 [The Deuce] 
 42nd Street Forever Vol. 3: Exploitation Explosion! 
 42nd Street Forever Vol. 4 – 2008 
 42nd Street Forever Vol. 5: Alamo Drafthouse Edition 
 42nd Street Forever: The Blu-ray Edition 
 42nd Street Forever: XXX-Treme Special Edition 
 Animalada
 Asian Cult Cinema: Extreme Horror Collection; Organ, Evil Dead Trap, Entrails of a Virgin, Entrails of a Beautiful Virgin.
 Asylum (aka I Want to Be a Gangster) 
 At Midnight I'll Take Your Soul 
 Bacchanales Sexuelles 
 Basket Case 2
 Basket Case 3: The Progeny 
 Battle Girl: The Living Dead in Tokyo Bay
 Beast from Haunted Cave 
 Bizarre 
 Black Roses 
 The Booby Hatch 
 The Brain That Wouldn't Die (Special Edition)
 Brutes And Savages [Uncivilized Version]
 Budo: The Art of Killing
 Castle of Blood [Uncut International Version]
 The Chick's Ability
 Chiller – The Complete Television Series 
 Christmas Evil [Special Edition] 
 The Coffin Joe Trilogy [3 DVD Set]; At Midnight I'll Take Your Soul, Embodiment of Evil, This Night I'll Possess Your Corpse
 Cold Hearts
 The Complete Hammer House of Horror, [5-Disc DVD Set] 
 Countess Dracula
 The Creep Behind the Camera [Special Edition] 
 Curtains 
 Cyclone 
 Dark Forces 
 The Deadly Spawn [Special Edition] 
 Death of a Snowman
 The Definitive Document of the Dead
 Demons 2 
 Demons [Movie-Only Version] 
 Django the Bastard [Blu-ray]
 The Dorm That Dripped Blood (Uncensored Directors’ Cut)
  Effects
 Embodiment of Evil [BD/DVD Combo Pack]
 Entrails Of A Beautiful Woman 
 Entrails of a Virgin 
 Evil Dead Trap 
 Executive Koala 
 Exposed 
 The Exterminator
 Fantasm
 Fantasm Comes Again 
 Frankenhooker 
 Frat House Massacre [Director's Cut] 
 God Has A Rap Sheet 
 The Grapes Of Death
 Gurozuka
 Hands of the Ripper
 Home Sick
 Hot Dog…The Movie (Unrated Producer's Cut) 
 The Image [Blu-ray]
 Intruder [Blu-ray/DVD Combo] 
 Invasion U.S.A. (Atomic Special Edition) 
 Just Desserts: The Making of “Creepshow” [Special Edition Blu-ray] 
 Karaoke Terror 
 The Kindred
 Lemora: A Child's Tale of the Supernatural 
 Let Me Die a Woman [Transgendered Edition] 
 The Life and Death of a Porno Gang
 Long Weekend
 Lucker the Necrophagous [Director's Cut]
 Madame O
 Maniac Cop
 Manos: The Hands of Fate [Special Edition Blu-ray]
 Morituris: Legions of the Dead  
 Mosquito: 20th Anniversary Edition 
 Night of Death 
 Night Train 
 Olga's Girls
 Organ 
 Party 7 
 Path of Blood
 Patrick 
 Phenomena [Two-Disc Blu-ray Edition] 
 Popcorn [Blu-ray] & (Collector's Edition Steelbook)
 Prom Night
 Red Scorpion 
 Reel Zombies
 Resonnances 
 Rock ‘n’ Roll Nightmare
 Rosarigasinos
 The Rug Cop
 Samurai Avenger: The Blind Wolf
 Singapore Sling 
 Six Days In Roswell
 Slaughter of the Innocents
 Small Gauge Trauma Vol. 1 [Fantasia Film Festival] 
 Sorceress (Uncensored Director Approved Edition) 
 South of Heaven
 Stacy 
 Stalingrad [2003 Mini-Series] & [Blu-ray Remaster] 
 Star Warp’d
 Stepfather 2 
 Stillwater
 Strange Behavior
 Street Trash – Special Meltdown Edition, [Single Disc Version] & [Two-Disc Meltdown Edition] 
 Suspiria
 The Sweet Life
 Syngenor
 Tenebrae (Single Disc) 
 The Violent Shit Collection – Five Film Special Shitition [3 DVDs]
 Thirst 
 This Night I'll Possess Your Corpse 
 Thou Shalt Not Kill... Except 
 Thundercrack! 40th Anniversary [2-Disc Special Edition] & [Single disc]
 Triumph of the Will [2006 Remaster] & [Blu-ray – 2K Remastered Edition] 
 Twins of Evil 
 Undertaker 
 Unearthed & Untold: The Path to Pet Sematary
 Vampire Circus 
 Watch Me When I Kill 
 Wild Zero 
 The World Sinks Except Japan
 Worm

Accolades
In 2016, film critic and author Maitland McDonagh was nominated for a Rondo Hatton Classic Horror Award for Best Commentary for her work on Synapse Films' DVD release of Dario Argento's film Tenebrae.

References

External links
 Official site

DVD companies of the United States
Exploitation films
Home video companies of the United States
1997 establishments in Michigan
Entertainment companies established in 1997
Companies based in Wayne County, Michigan